Deputies elected to the 54º legislature (February 1, 2011 – February 1, 2014) according to the results of Brazilian general elections, 2010

Acre

Alagoas

Amapá

Amazonas

Bahia

Ceará

Distrito Federal

Espírito Santo

Goiás

Maranhão

Mato Grosso

Mato Grosso do Sul

Minas Gerais

Pará

Paraíba

Paraná

Pernambuco

Piauí

Rio de Janeiro

Rio Grande do Norte

Rio Grande do Sul

Rondônia

Roraima

Santa Catarina

São Paulo

Sergipe

Tocantins

Legislative branch of Brazil